Çakmak is a surname. Notable people with the surname include:

 Esma Nur Çakmak (born 2004), Turkish female arm wrestler
 Fevzi Çakmak (1876–1950), Field marshal and prime minister of Turkey
 Nurhan Çakmak (born 1981), Turkish women's footballer
 Osman Çakmak (born 1977), Turkish amputee football manager and former player
 Serhat Çakmak (born 1995), Turkish football player
 Yasin Çakmak (born 1985), Turkish football player
 Mustafa Avcioğlu-Çakmak (1909-2009), Turkish wrestler

See also
 Çakmak, Çerkeş, a village in Çankırı province, Turkey
 Çakmak, Gazipaşa, a village in Antalya province, Turkey
 Çakmak, Gönen, a village in Balıkesir province, Turkey
 Çakmak, Harmancık, a village in Bursa province, Turkey
 Çakmak, Hınıs, a town in Erzurum province, Turkey
 Çakmak, Yenişehir, a village in Diyarbakır province, Turkey

Turkish-language surnames